The discography of American rapper Sir Mix-a-Lot consists of six studio albums and 15 singles.

Albums

Singles

Music videos

References

Hip hop discographies
Discographies of American artists